Nikolay (Nikolai, Mykola) Storozhenko may refer to:
 Nikolay Ilyich Storozhenko, literary historian
 Nikolay Vladimirovich Storozhenko, historian, nationalist
 Nikolay Andreyevich Storozhenko, painter